Jon Walmsley is a musician and actor.

Acting career
Walmsley is known for his accomplishments as an actor, most notably a nine-season run as Jason Walton on The Waltons. He also returned for all of the Waltons reunion projects during the 1980s and 1990s. 

He provided the voice of Christopher Robin for Disney's Winnie the Pooh cartoons.

Musical career 

Walmsley was a member of Richard Marx's touring band in the late 1980s, and appeared in at least two of Marx's music videos—"Should've Known Better" and "Too Late to Say Goodbye."

Filmography

1960s 
Combat! (ABC military drama, 1966)
Daniel Boone (NBC western series, 1968)
The One and Only, Genuine, Original Family Band (musical film with Walter Brennan and Buddy Ebsen, 1968)
Winnie the Pooh and the Blustery Day (1968) (voice)
My Three Sons (1968)
Adam-12 (NBC crime drama, 1969)
The Bill Cosby Show (1969)

1970s 
My Three Sons (1971)
The Homecoming: A Christmas Story (1971)
The ABC Saturday Superstar Movie (voice) 1972)
The Waltons (1972–1981)
The New Scooby-Doo Movies (1973–1974)
The Many Adventures of Winnie the Pooh (1977) (voice)
Dinky Hocker (1979)
Family Feud (1979)
$weepstake$ (1979)

1980s 
A Wedding on Walton's Mountain (1982)
Mother's Day on Walton's Mountain (1982)
A Day for Thanks on Walton's Mountain (1982)
Waiting to Act (1985)

1990s 
A Walton Thanksgiving Reunion (1993)
A Walton Wedding (1995)
A Walton Easter (1997)

2000s 
O Christmas Tree (TV Special) (2002)
TV total German Talkshow (2004)
7th Heaven (2005)
8 Simple Rules (2005)
It's Always Sunny In Philadelphia (2006)
Elf Sparkle Meets Christmas The Horse (animation) (voice) (2009)
Elf Sparkle And The Special Red Dress (animation) (voice) (2010)
Waltons (TV special) (2010)
The Today Show (2011)
Good Morning America (2013)

Musical works
 The Waltons – TV Series (composer, musician) 1971–1981
 7th Heaven – TV Series (musician) 1996–2007
 Waltons' Christmas CD (composer, musician, producer) 1999
 For the Love of May – Short Movie (composer, musician, producer) 2000
 8 Simple Rules – TV Series (musician) 2002–2005
 The Sunflowers – CD (musician, producer) 2005
 Primal Twang – The legacy of the guitar DVD (musician) 2008
 Love-in Show – A Musical Celebration DVD (musician) 2009
 Secret Life of the American Teenager – TV Series (musician) 2008–2013
 Elf Sparkle and the Special Red Dress – Animation (composer) 2010
 The U.K. Beat – CD (composer, musician, producer) 2010
 The Sunflowers – CD (Musician, producer) 2011
 A Joyful Noise – CD (composer, musician, producer) 2013 (soon to be released)
 Christmas In America – single (composer, Musician, producer) 2014
Goin' To Clarksdale – CD (composer, musician, producer) 2017

References

External links 
 Jon Walmsley on Facebook
 Jon Walmsley on Twitter
 Jon Walmsley on IMDB
 Jon Walmsley Official Website

1956 births
Living people
Male actors
Strawberry Alarm Clock members
The Waltons